Andrey Alekseyevich Dvinyaninov (3 September 1985 – 24 June 2017) was a Russian sledge hockey player. In the 2014 Winter Paralympics, he won the silver medal in the men's sledge hockey tournament with Russia.

Life 
He served in the army, and while serving his feet were frozen, and later amputated. In 2009 he began training in his home town for sledge hockey.

On June 24, 2017, Dvinyaninov became ill on his way to the shops, and his parents called the ambulance, which arrived roughly an hour later, but by then Dvinyaninov was already in critical condition, and died. Preliminary reports suggest he died of a heart attack, though there has yet to be an autopsy.

References

External links 
 

1985 births
2017 deaths
Russian sledge hockey players
Paralympic sledge hockey players of Russia
Paralympic silver medalists for Russia
Ice sledge hockey players at the 2014 Winter Paralympics
Medalists at the 2014 Winter Paralympics
Paralympic medalists in sledge hockey
Sportspeople from Izhevsk
21st-century Russian people